The Malaysian Highway Authority (LLM) is a statutory body under the Malaysian Ministry of Works (MOW). The agency was founded on 24 October 1980 by the Highway Authority of Malaysia (Incorporation) Act 1980 to monitor the works and administration of expressways. The establishment of the agency coincided with the construction of the North-South Expressway.

Offices
 Bangi, Selangor
 Gelugor, Penang
 Kuantan, Pahang
 Ajil, Terengganu
 Senai, Johor

External links
 Malaysian Highway Authority (MHA) website

Malaysian Public Works Department
Malaysian Expressway System
Federal ministries, departments and agencies of Malaysia
1980 establishments in Malaysia
Government agencies established in 1980
Ministry of Works (Malaysia)